Eschweiler is a municipality in North Rhine-Westphalia, Germany.

Eschweiler may also refer to:


People
Franz Gerhard Eschweiler (1796–1831), German botanist
Franz C. Eschweiler (1863–1929), an American jurist
Alexander C. Eschweiler (1865–1940), an American architect
Karl Eschweiler (1886–1936), a German Catholic theologian and Nazi
Walter Eschweiler (born 1935), a German football referee

Places
Eschweiler, Grevenmacher, a village in central Luxembourg
Eschweiler, Wiltz, a town and former commune in northern Luxembourg

Other uses
Eschweiler Hauptbahnhof, a train station in the German municipality

See also
Eschweiler–Clarke reaction, named for the German chemist Wilhelm Eschweiler (1860–1936)